The 1971 Omloop Het Volk was the 26th edition of the Omloop Het Volk cycle race and was held on 25 March 1971. The race started and finished in Ghent. The race was won by Eddy Merckx.

General classification

References

1971
Omloop Het Nieuwsblad
Omloop Het Nieuwsblad